is a town located in Aki District, Kōchi Prefecture, Japan.

Geography 
Nahari is located in southeastern  Kōchi Prefecture on the island of Shikoku, with a coastline the Pacific Ocean to the southwest.

Neighbouring municipalities 
Kōchi Prefecture
 Muroto
  Tano
 Kitagawa

Climate
Nahari has a Humid subtropical climate (Köppen Cfa) characterized by warm summers and cool winters with light snowfall.  The average annual temperature in Nahari is 16.2 °C. The average annual rainfall is 2541 mm with September as the wettest month. The temperatures are highest on average in January, at around 25.5 °C, and lowest in January, at around 6.7 °C.

Demographics
Per Japanese census data, the population of Nahari has been decreased steadily since the 1960s.

History 
As with all of Kōchi Prefecture, the area of Nahari was part of ancient Tosa Province. The name of Aki District appears in Nara period . During the Edo period, the area was part of the holdings of Tosa Domain ruled by the Yamauchi clan from their seat at Kōchi Castle. The village of Nahari was established with the creation of the modern municipalities system on October 1, 1889. It was raised to town status on May 1, 1916.

Government
Nahari has a mayor-council form of government with a directly elected mayor and a unicameral town council of ten members. Nahari, together with the other municipalities of Aki District, contributes one member to the Kōchi Prefectural Assembly. In terms of national politics, the town is part of Kōchi 1st district of the lower house of the Diet of Japan.

Economy
Nahari's economy is centered on commercial fishing, horticulture, and small ship repair.

Education
Nahari has two public elementary schools and one public middle school operated by the village government. The town does not have a high school.

Transportation

Railway
Tosa Kuroshio Railway - Asa Line

Highways

References

External links

Nahari official website 

Towns in Kōchi Prefecture
Populated coastal places in Japan